Thallamapuram is a village in Proddatur Mandal in Kadapa District in Andhra Pradesh State.

Villages in Kadapa district